RAF Middleton St George is a former Royal Air Force (RAF) and Royal Canadian Air Force (RCAF) Bomber Command station during the Second World War. It was located in County Durham, six miles east of Darlington, England. The station's motto was Shield and Deter. The aerodrome remains active as Teesside International Airport.

History

Second World War

Like many similar airfields; RAF Middleton St George was commissioned in 1938 in anticipation of WWII and opened in 1941 under the auspices of Bomber Command. Contrary to popular belief the airfield was never called RAF Goosepool, Goosepool being the name of the farm which made way for the airfield, with the name sticking amongst the local population.

Initial Squadrons based here were 76 Squadron with Handley Page Halifaxes and 78 Squadron which flew Armstrong Whitworth Whitleys.

In 1943 it was allocated to No. 6 Group, Royal Canadian Air Force. A sub-station was located at RAF Croft, Yorkshire although RAF Thornaby was closer yet never held sub-station status. Canadian Squadrons based here were 419 "Moose" Squadron, which flew Vickers Wellingtons, Halifaxes, and Avro Lancasters, 420 "Snowy Owl" Squadron, which flew Wellingtons, and 428 "Ghost" Squadron, which flew Wellingtons, Halifaxes, and Lancasters.

There are two stories of heroism linked with RAF Middleton St George, the most notable being that of Andrew Mynarski, a member of 419 Squadron, who was posthumously awarded the Victoria Cross. It was bestowed for his actions on 13 June 1944, in a raid on Cambrai, France, in support of the Normandy landings. A statue of Mynarski was dedicated in 2005 outside the former Officers' Mess. The second belongs to William McMullen of 428 Squadron, who was killed during a routine training sortie on 13 January 1945 when his Lancaster crashed on the outskirts of Darlington after he remained with the aircraft to steer it away from houses, having ordered his crew to bail out. McMullen Road adjacent to the crash site was renamed in his honour.

A memorial garden for all aircrew at Middleton St George is also located near the Mess.

Post war

After the war, the aerodrome changed hands regularly between Bomber Command, Fighter Command and Flying Training Command, serving various squadrons and units including No. 13 Operational Training Unit (OTU) using de Havilland Mosquitos, No. 2 Air Navigation School using Avro Ansons and Vickers Wellingtons, No. 205 Advanced Flying Training School (later rebranded No. 4 Flying Training School) using de Havilland Vampires and Gloster Meteors, 92 Squadron using Hawker Hunters, 264 Squadron (later rebranded No. 33 Squadron) using Gloster Meteors, the Javelin Instrument Rating Squadron (IRS) using Gloster Javelins and the Lightning Conversion Unit (LCU) (later rebranded the Lightning Conversion Squadron) using English Electric Lightnings. The IRS and LCS were later merged to form 226 Operational Conversion Unit (OCU).

In 1962 Flying Officer Jean Oakes became the first woman to fly at over 1,000 mph. The London Times of 14 September 1962 reported that from RAF Middleton St George, she took over the controls from Flight Lieutenant John Smith and flew up and down the north east coast at about Mach 1.6.

The RAF left the station in 1964 and handed it over to the Ministry of Civil Aviation who reopened the site as a civil airport. The airfield was named Tees-Side Airport until 1987, then Teesside International Airport until 2004 when it became Durham Tees Valley Airport before reverting to Teesside International in 2019.

From 1968 to 1979, some of the former station buildings housed Middleton St George College of Education, a teacher training college.

The officers' mess at the base was converted into the St George Hotel, complete with the RAF Middleton St George memorial room. The hotel was mothballed in late 2018; the museum is to be relocated in the future.

The Sergeants' mess remains in use by Serco, who operate the International Fire Training Centre located on the site, and the Armoury currently houses a flying school, Scenic Air Tours and Flight Training.

Units and aircraft

References

Citations

Bibliography

External links

 76 Squadron History
 78 Squadron history and current status
 419 Squadron History
 420 Squadron History
 428 Squadron History
 608 Squadron History

Royal Air Force stations in County Durham
Royal Air Force stations of World War II in the United Kingdom